As of September 2015, the Porto Alegre Metro system (locally known as Trensurb) has 22 stations in Line 1.

Stations by city in route order

Porto Alegre
Mercado
Rodoviária
São Pedro
Farrapos
Aeroporto
Anchieta

Canoas
Niterói
Fátima
Canoas/La Salle
Mathias Velho
São Luís/Ulbra
Petrobrás

Esteio
Esteio

Sapucaia do Sul
Luiz Pasteur
Sapucaia

São Leopoldo
Unisinos
São Leopoldo
Rio dos Sinos

Novo Hamburgo
Santo Afonso
Industrial
Fenac
Novo Hamburgo

Porto Alegre
Transport in Rio Grande do Sul